Shorea thorelii is a highly vulnerable species of Asian trees, described by Pierre and Lanessan, which is included in the genus Shorea and family Dipterocarpaceae; the species is named after the French botanist Clovis Thorel. No subspecies are listed in the Catalogue of Life.

Distributed throughout Indochina, its name in Vietnam is chai or chai Thorel: and labelled specimens can be found in the ForestFloorLodge area of Cat Tien National Park.

References

External links 

thorelii
Flora of Indo-China
Taxonomy articles created by Polbot